Assen-Zuid (English: Assen South) is a planned railway station in Assen, Netherlands.

Assen city official Alex Langius said in February 2012 that the station is expected to be built south of the N33 road, between Assen railway station and Beilen railway station, along the existing Meppel-Groningen railway. Langius described the station as an 'events station', meaning it would be used to transport train passengers to events such as those at motorsport race track TT Circuit Assen.

Langius said discussions are ongoing between Assen, Nederlandse Spoorwegen, ProRail and the provincial government. He said a decision about the start of the construction of the station is expected by the end of 2012, with construction possibly beginning in 2014 or 2015. It is planned to eventually transform Assen-Zuid into a full station with regular service.

See also
 Assen railway station
 List of railway stations in Drenthe

References

Buildings and structures in Assen
Railway stations in Drenthe
Railway stations on the Staatslijn C
1975 establishments in the Netherlands
Railway stations in the Netherlands opened in the 20th century